When the Weather Is Fine is a 2020 South Korean television series starring Park Min-young and Seo Kang-joon. Based on the 2018 novel of the same name by Lee Do-woo, it aired on JTBC from February 24 to April 21, 2020.

Synopsis
After a series of unfortunate events, cellist Mok Hae-won (Park Min-young) quits her job in Seoul and goes back to Bookhyun Village, in Gangwon Province, where she briefly lived when she was in high school. There, she meets again her former classmate and neighbor, Im Eun-seob (Seo Kang-joon) who owns a bookstore now. In the cold winter, trying to escape the harsh and bitter reality of life, they both find warmth in each other that is enough to melt their long-frozen hearts. Together, they heal from their past wounds and eventually fall in love.

Cast

Main
 Park Min-young as Mok Hae-won ("Irene"), an unemployed cello teacher.
 Park Seo-kyung as young Hae-won.
 Seo Kang-joon as Im Eun-seob / Kim Jin-ho, a bookstore owner.
 Ok Chan-yu as young Jin-ho.

Supporting

Hae-won's family
 Moon Jeong-hee as Shim Myeong-yeo, Hae-won's aunt, a writer and inn owner.
 Kim Hong-bin	as young Myeong-yeo.
 Lee Young-ran as Yoon Hye-ja, Hae-won's grandmother, she founded the inn.
 Jin Hee-kyung as Shim Myeong-joo, Hae-won's mother.
 Jeon Yoo-rim	as young Myeong-joo.
 Seo Tae-hwa as Mok Joo-hong, Hye-won's father.

Eun-seob's family
 Kim Hwan-hee as Im Hwi, Eun-seob's adoptive little sister.
 Im Hwi is a boisterous girl who has a habit for taking other people's wallets to finance her wants. Although her loquacious behavior often comes across as tactless, she can also hold a serious conversation that displays a level of maturity on certain occasions. She professes to be a master of coping with rejection after having been rejected many times by the boy she likes.
 Nam Gi-ae as Yoon Yeo-jeong, Eun-seob's adoptive mother.
 Kang Shin-il as Im Jong-pil, Eun-seob's adoptive father.
 Kang Jin-hwi as Kim Gil, Eun-seob's father.
 Kang Jin-hwi as Kim Gil-dong, Eun-seob's uncle.

Hyecheon High School alumni
 Lee Jae-wook as Lee Jang-woo, Eun-seob's friend in high school.
 Oh Ja-hun as young Jang-woo.
 Kim Young-dae as Oh Young-woo, he used to be the top student and he was/is attracted to Hae-won.
 Yang Hye-ji as Ji Eun-shil, Jang-woo's first love.
 Im Se-mi as Kim Bo-young, Hae-won's former friend in high school.
 Park Han-sol as Joo-hee, Bo-yeong's classmate.

Goodnight Bookstore's book club members
 Lee Tae-hyung as Bae Geun-sang
 Lee Seon-hee as Choi Soo-jung, Myeong-yeo's friend.
 Chu Ye-jin as Kwon Hyun-ji, Hwi's friend.
 Han Chang-min as Jung Seung-ho
 Lee Young-seok as Jung Gil-bok

Others
 Ahn Dong-goo as young Cha Yoon-taek
 Lee Bong-ryun as Jang Ha-nim
 Kim Dae-geon as Kim Yeong-soo
 Yoon Sang-hwa as Park Hin-dol
 Hwang Gun as Cha Yoon-taek
 Noh Jae-hoon as Jung Hee

Special appearances
 Seo Tae-hwa as Mok Joo-hong
 Lee Seo-an as Jang-woo's blind date

Production
The first script reading took place in October 2019 at JTBC Building in Sangam-dong, Seoul, South Korea.

On March 3, 2020, it was announced that the drama would take a break from filming for a week to take precautions against the spread of COVID-19. Episodes 5 and 6, which were originally scheduled to air on March 9 and 10 respectively, aired on March 16 and 17.

Original soundtrack

Part 1

Part 2

Part 3

Part 4

Part 5

Part 6

Part 7

Chart performance

Ratings

Notes

International broadcast
 In Sri Lanka, the drama is available to stream via Iflix with subtitles. During its original run, new episodes of the drama were made available to stream 48 hours after the original Korean broadcast.

References

External links
  
 
 

JTBC television dramas
Korean-language television shows
2020 South Korean television series debuts
2020 South Korean television series endings
Television shows based on South Korean novels